Matthew Tuck (born 20 January 1980) is a Welsh musician, best known as the lead vocalist and rhythm guitarist of the metal band Bullet for My Valentine. He is also a singer and guitarist in the supergroup AxeWound, which was formed in 2012.

Career

Bullet for My Valentine formed in 1998 under the name Jeff Killed John and were originally a nu metal band. After bassist Nick Crandle left in 2003, they picked up Jason James as their new bassist and renamed the band Bullet for My Valentine. They have released six studio albums and four EPs.

Tuck is also the backing vocalist and rhythm guitarist in the supergroup AxeWound.

On 22 June 2007 it was announced that he needed a tonsillectomy. The band was forced to cancel all of their shows, including their tour as a support band for Metallica. Unable to speak, Tuck wrote that as soon as doctors cleared him he would be in the studio working on the band's next album.

Influences
Tuck's earliest influences included the music his father listened to, including Status Quo and Bruce Springsteen.

Later he was influenced by Nirvana, Pantera, Slayer, Machine Head, Iron Maiden, Motley Crue, Def Leppard, Limp Bizkit and Jimmy Eat World.

However, his biggest influence growing up was Metallica, with their eponymous Black Album being the first record he ever bought after he heard the song "Enter Sandman" for the first time. They were the main reason why he would start to play the guitar, learning the riffs by ear; eventually paving the way for his musical career.

Personal life
Tuck married Charlotte Beedell on 7 September 2013 in London. The couple have two sons and filed for divorce in early 2016 but later reconciled.

Discography

Bullet for My Valentine

Studio albums 
The Poison (2005)
Scream Aim Fire (2008)
Fever (2010)
Temper Temper (2013)
Venom (2015)
Gravity (2018)
Bullet for My Valentine (2021)

EPs 
Better Off Alone (1999)
Don't Walk Away (2003)
Jeff Killed John (2003)
Bullet for My Valentine (2004)
Hand of Blood (2005)
Rare Cuts (2007)
Road to Nowhere (2008)

AxeWound
Vultures (2012)

References

External links

1980 births
Welsh rock singers
Living people
21st-century Welsh male singers
21st-century British guitarists
British heavy metal singers
Bullet for My Valentine members
Nu metal singers
People from Bridgend
Rhythm guitarists
Welsh heavy metal guitarists
Welsh singer-songwriters
Welsh tenors
AxeWound members
British male singer-songwriters